Geeta  is a Bollywood film directed by Parshwanath Yeshwant Altekar and starring Chandra Mohan, Durga Khote and Anant Marathe. It was released in 1940. The film produced under the Circo Productions banner was a bilingual made in Hindi and Marathi. The story was written by Minoo Katrak who in later films was to become a renowned sound recordist. The cinematographer was Gordhanbhai Patel and the film's music was composed by Datta Koregaonkar. It's dialogues and song lyrics were by S. K. Kallah with screenplay by Altekar. The rest of the cast included Trilok Kapoor, Ashalata, Vatsala Kumtekar and Baby Suman.

The film starred Durga Khote and Chandra Mohan in the same film for the second time. They had earlier acted in Amar Jyoti (1936) but not opposite each other. Chandra Mohan was cast in a double role in this film, playing the role of father and older son.

The story involves a restless man, whose hardships and needs make him leave his virtuous wife. Taking his young son Mohan along, he turns to a life of crime, inducing Mohan to become an outlaw with him.

Plot
Shankar (Chandra Mohan) lives an unhappy existence with his pious wife Durga (Durga Khote), and son Mohan. Durga is a staunch believer of and clings rigidly to the teachings of Bhagavad Geeta. Shankar is irritated with his wife's devotional attendance on holy scripture, especially as the family is poor and things are not working out for him. One day, he takes his young son Mohan and leaves Durga behind. An expectant Durga, does not give up her beliefs and brings up the second child with good attributes and education. Shnkar now starts following a life of crime, in which Mohan joins him. Several years pass with Shankar and Mohan, now grown (Chandra Mohan again) continuing with their looting and killing. Shankar is caught in one of the killing sprees with the plotting of an opposite gang member and hanged. Mohan vows to take revenge on the gang for his father's death. He is soon caught and brought to court where his own younger brother Kumar (Trilok Kapoor) is the prosecutor. The mother meets her older son, and Mohan is finally repentant and looking for atonement.

Cast
 Chandra Mohan as Shankar/Mohan
 Durga Khote as Durga
 Anant Marathe as Shankar's son
 Vatsala Kumtekar as Sundari, Mohan's prostitute girlfriend
 Ashalata as Lata, Sundari's sister wo is a devotee of Mohan's mother's teachings
 Trilok Kapoor as Kumar
 S. Nazir
 Baby Suman
 S. Prahlad
 Keki Bawa

Review

According to Baburao Patel in his review of the film in the November 1940 issue of Filmindia, he found the production to be of a poor standard, the direction weak, the songs "hopeless", and that bad editing tended to drag the picture. He praised the acting of Durga Khote "sparkling" and he found Chandra Mohan to be "Irresistible, inimitable and incomparable" and "he thunders through the picture like a giant,.... The man acts in his words. His very voice thrills with its well measured modulations tuned to the subtleties of the different situations". Anant Marathe as the young boy "must be mentioned with these big names. He is the only one who keeps good company with a confidence that suggests experience and courage."

Soundtrack
The music composition was by Datta Koregaonkar with lyrics by S. K. Kallah. List:

Songlist

References

External links
 

1940 films
1940s Hindi-language films
Indian black-and-white films